The Uttar Pradesh University of Medical Sciences, formerly U.P. Rural Institute of Medical Sciences and Research, is a medical school, hospital and medical research public university located at Saifai in the Etawah District of Uttar Pradesh, India. It came into being after the upgrade of UP Rural Institute of Medical Sciences and Research (established in 2005) by Government of Uttar Pradesh under Act 15 of 2016.

History
In 2005, U.P. Rural Institute of Medical Sciences and Research, a state government run medical college affiliated with Chhatrapati Shahu Ji Maharaj University, Kanpur was established in Saifai village, District Etawah, Uttar Pradesh. It was established by UPRIMS&R, Saifai, Act 2005 notified on 15 December 2005. M.B.B.S. course started in 2006, M.D. course started in 2011, M.S. course started in 2013, M.D.S. course started in 2014 and M.Ch. courses started in 2020. Paramedical and Nursing Colleges of Institute started in 2012 and Pharmacy College started in 2015. From acedmic year 2023, university is supposed to start Masters degree in Paramedical, Nursing and Pharmacy.

In February 2015, Government of Uttar Pradesh started the process of establishing a university of medical sciences in Saifai, Etawah by upgrading existing U.P. Rural Institute of Medical Sciences and Research. On 4 February 2015, the state assembly passed a bill named "Uttar Pradesh University of Medical Sciences, Saifai, Etawah Bill-2015". On 2 May 2016 the Bill was approved and it became a university on 5 June 2016.

Vice-chancellors
 Prabhat Kumar Singh (19 January 2022 – present)
 Ramakant Yadav (10 May 2021 - 18 January 2022)
Raj Kumar (1 June 2018 - 9 May 2021)
T. Prabhakar (12 July 2016 - 31 May 2018)

Facilities
The university is running full-fledged Medical College, Dental College (postgraduate), Paramedical College, Nursing College, Pharmacy College, Multi Specialty 850 bedded hospital and 150 bedded trauma and burn center.

500 bedded super specialty hospital and 300 bedded Obstetrics & Gynecology and Pediatrics hospital is being established in the university by Government of Uttar Pradesh at cost of 750 ₹ crores which will be spread across 50 acres of land.

Constituent colleges 

 Medical College, founded in 2005 as U.P. Gramin Ayurvigyan Avam Anusandhan Sansthan (U.P. Rural Institute of Medical Sciences and Research in English). It was affiliated with Chhatrapati Shahu Ji Maharaj University till 2016 with all other constituent colleges except one.
 College of Dentistry(postgraduate), started in the year of 2014 with 2 Postgraduate seats.
 Paramedical Vigyan Mahavidyalaya, proposed in the year of 2006 and started in the year of 2012.
 College of Nursing, started in the year of 2012.
 Pharmacy College Saifai, started in the year of 2015. Unlike other colleges, instead of Chhatrapati Shahu Ji Maharaj University, it was affiliated with Uttar Pradesh Technical University (UPTU) for the academic session of 2015–16. It is first grant-in-aid college run by Uttar Pradesh Government offering B.Pharm degree.

References

External links
 

 
Medical and health sciences universities in India
Universities in Uttar Pradesh
Medical colleges in Uttar Pradesh
Pharmacy colleges in Uttar Pradesh
Nursing schools in India
Universities and colleges in Saifai
2005 establishments in Uttar Pradesh
Educational institutions established in 2005
Public medical universities